The Lido Theatre is an atmospheric theatre in The Pas, Manitoba. The Lido Theatre began operations in 1929 and has remained running in its original form since its inception, making it one of Canada's oldest and most unique atmospheric theaters still in operation.

References

The Pas
Theatres completed in 1929

Atmospheric theatres
Theatres in Manitoba